The 2012–13 Men's FIH Hockey World League Semifinals took place from June to July 2013. A total of 16 teams competing in 2 events were part in this round of the tournament playing for 7 berths in the Final, played between 10 and 18 January 2014 in New Delhi, India.

This round also served as the qualifier for the 2014 Men's Hockey World Cup as the 6 highest placed teams apart from the host nation and the five continental champions qualified.

Qualification
8 teams ranked between 1st and 8th in the FIH World Rankings current at the time of seeking entries for the competition qualified automatically. After Germany announced they would not be able host a Semifinal due to financial restrictions, Malaysia was chosen to do so therefore exempt from Round 2, to which were qualified by ranking basis. For this reason one less berth was available at that event and only 7 teams qualified from Round 2. France (17th) qualified as the highest-ranked second-placed team between the Saint-Germain-en-Laye and Elektrostal Round 2 events, leaving Russia (20th) unable to qualify. The following sixteen teams, shown with final pre-tournament rankings, competed in this round of the tournament.

Rotterdam

Umpires
Below are the 10 umpires appointed by the International Hockey Federation:

Bruce Bale (ENG)
Fernando Gómez (ARG)
Kim Hong-lae (KOR)
Satoshi Kondo (JPN)
Lim Hong Zhen (SIN)
Germán Montes de Oca (ARG)
Deon Nel (RSA)
Tim Pullman (AUS)
Simon Taylor (NZL)
Roderick Wijsmuller (NED)

First round

Pool A

During the pre-game formalities, New Zealand's national anthem was accidentally played instead of Australia's national anthem, playing for 25 seconds before audio staff realised the mistake and stopped the music.

Pool B

Second round

Quarterfinals

Fifth to eighth place classification

Crossover

Seventh and eighth place

Fifth and sixth place

First to fourth place classification

Semifinals

Third and fourth place

Final

Johor Bahru

Umpires
Below are the 10 umpires appointed by the International Hockey Federation:

Diego Barbas (ARG)
Christian Blasch (GER)
Hamish Jamson (ENG)
Adam Kearns (AUS)
Eric Koh (MAS)
Francesco Parisi (ITA)
Raghu Prasad (IND)
Ayden Shrives (RSA)
Coen Van Bunge (NED)
Paco Vázquez (ESP)

First round

Pool A

Pool B

Second round

Quarterfinals

Fifth to eighth place classification

Crossover

Seventh and eighth place

Fifth and sixth place

First to fourth place classification

Semifinals

Third and fourth place

Final

Awards

Final rankings
Qualification for 2014 Hockey World Cup

 Host nation
 Continental champions
 Qualified through 2012–13 FIH Hockey World League

References

External links
Official website (Rotterdam)
Official website (Johor Bahru)

Semifinals
Men's Hockey World Cup qualifiers
International field hockey competitions hosted by the Netherlands
International field hockey competitions hosted by Malaysia